Roti language may refer to:

one of the Roti languages of Timor
the Roti dialect of Indonesian Bajaw